The eighth series of the British television drama series, Waterloo Road, began broadcasting on 23 August 2012, and ended on 4 July 2013 on BBC One. It consisted of thirty episodes. The series follows the lives of the faculty and pupils of the eponymous school. While a comprehensive school in all other series, Waterloo Road is a privately funded independent school for the majority of the eighth series. Production also relocated to Greenock, Scotland beginning with this series. This series shows the final appearance of Tom Clarkson (Jason Done).

Plot
The show follows the lives of the teachers and the pupils at the eponymous school of Waterloo Road, a failing inner-city comprehensive, tackling a wide range of issues often seen as taboo such as alcoholism, pyromania, teenage pregnancy, fostering, exorcism, coercive control, freeganism, adoption, pole-dancing, rape, burn injury, terminal illness, workplace bullying, self-harming, deafness, activism, blackmail, gender identity disorder, euthanasia, alcoholic hepatitis, assault, kidney failure, kidney donation and post-traumatic stress disorder.

Cast and characters

Staff
 Alec Newman as Michael Byrne; Headteacher (28 episodes)
 Laurie Brett as Christine Mulgrew; Head of English and Acting Headteacher (30 episodes)
 Jason Done as Tom Clarkson; Deputy Headteacher and English teacher (30 episodes)
 Georgie Glen as Audrey McFall; Head of History (29 episodes)
 Daniela Denby-Ashe as Lorraine Donnegan; School benefactor (27 episodes)
 Melanie Hill as Maggie Budgen; Home Economics teacher, Senior Canteen Assistant and Housemistress (27 episodes)
 Philip Martin Brown as Grantly Budgen; English teacher and Housemaster (24 episodes)
 Victoria Bush as Sonya Donnegan; School secretary (22 episodes)
 Mark Benton as Daniel "Chalky" Chalk; Head of Mathematics (20 episodes)
 Heather Peace as Nikki Boston; Deputy Headteacher, English teacher and Head of Pupil Referral Unit (20 episodes)
 Jaye Jacobs as Sian Diamond; Deputy Headteacher and Head of Science (19 episodes)
 Richie Campbell as Ndale Kayuni; School handyman (7 episodes)
 Chelsee Healey as Janeece Bryant; School secretary (6 episodes)
 Daniela Nardini as Esther Fairclough; Acting Head of Science (4 episodes)
 Angus Deayton as George Windsor; Head of Modern Foreign Languages (3 episodes)
 Richard Mylan as Simon Lowsley; Deputy Headteacher and English teacher (2 episodes)

Pupils
 Shane O'Meara as Connor Mulgrew (30 episodes)
 Kirstie Steele as Imogen Stewart (30 episodes)
 Kane Tomlinson-Weaver as Harley Taylor (30 episodes)
 Rebecca Craven as Rhiannon Salt (28 episodes)
 Marlene Madenge as Lula Tsibi (26 episodes)
 Tommy Lawrence Knight as Kevin Chalk (23 episodes)
 Carl Au as Barry Barry (20 episodes)
 Brogan Ellis as Kacey Barry (20 episodes)
 Abby Mavers as Dynasty Barry (20 episodes)
 Katie McGlynn as Jodie "Scout" Allen (20 episodes)
 Adiza Shardow as Liberty Gordon (20 episodes)
 Taylor Rhys as Jack McAllister (19 episodes)
 Paige Meade as Jade Fleming (18 episodes)
 Kaya Moore as Phoenix Taylor (12 episodes)
 Naveed Choudhry as Tariq Siddiqui (8 episodes)
 Benjamin Gur as Angus "Gus" Hancock (8 episodes)
 William Rush as Josh Stevenson (7 episodes)
 Georgia Henshaw as Madi Diamond (6 episodes)

Others

Recurring
 Zöe Lucker as Carol Barry; Mother of the Barry children (8 episodes)
 Ron Donachie as Billy Byrne; Michael's terminally ill father (7 episodes)
 Alex Norton as Gerard Findlay; Headteacher of Havelock High (6 episodes)
 Jody Latham as Steve-O Malone; Dynasty's boyfriend (4 episodes)
 Jenny Ryan as Sally Stewart; Imogen's mother (3 episodes)
 Alisa Anderson as Zoe Foster; Pupil (2 episodes)
 Leyla Ogulyaymis as Cheryl Bryant; Janeece's young daughter (2 episodes)
 Lisa Riley as Tina Allen; Scout's mother (2 episodes)
 Shaun Prendergast as Robert Bain; Director of the Department for Education (2 episodes)

Guest
 Mhairi Anderson as Morag Murray; Pupil (1 episode)
 Fraser Ayres as Duncan Kilty; Owner of a pole-dancing bar (1 episode)
 Patrick Baladi as Julian Noble; Television presenter for Noble Thoughts (1 episode)
 James Daffern as Ray Keats; Head of Lorraine's call centre and careers advisor (1 episode)
 James Doherty as Martin Johnson; School governor (1 episode)
 Nicola Duffett as Daisy Skelton; Kevin's estranged mother (1 episode)
 Niall Greig Fulton as Kai Murray; Morag and Ewan's father (1 episode)
 Jan Goodman as Maureen Donnegan; Lorraine and Sonya's mother (1 episode)
 Clare Grogan as Sandra Gordon; Liberty's mother (1 episode)
 Bill Fellows as Trevor Croft; Maggie's husband (1 episode)
 Max Fowler as Drew Kelly; Jade's abusive boyfriend (1 episode)
 Gaynor Howe as Sarah Winters; Adoptive mother of Jade's unborn baby (1 episode)
 Emmanuel Ighodaro as Kaz Winters; Adoptive father of Jade's unborn baby (1 episode)
 Raji James as Usman Haq; Owner of Prince of Spices fast food (1 episode)
 Cornell S John as Lionel Tsibi; Lula's uncle (1 episode)
 Daniel Kerr as Ewan Murray; Pupil (1 episode)
 Pollyanna McIntosh as Olivia McAllister; Jack's mother (1 episode)
 Anna-Maria Nabirye as Cecile Tsibi; Lula's mother (1 episode)
 Tachia Newall as Bolton Smilie; Ex-pupil and Army officer (1 episode)
 Derek Riddell as Joe Mulgrew; Christine's ex-husband (1 episode)
 George Sampson as Kyle Stack; Pupil (1 episode)
 Sam Lucas Smith as Fergal Doherty; Pupil (1 episode)
 John Kay Steel as Dr. Fielding Granger; Grantly's consultant (1 episode)
 Elizabeth Tan as Princess Windsor; George's wife (1 episode)
 Vishal Thakur as Nasir Haq; Pupil (1 episode)
 John Thomson as Nelson Smith; Phoenix and Harley's father (1 episode)
 Josie Walker as Theresa Doherty; Fergal's mother (1 episode)

Episodes

{| class="wikitable plainrowheaders" width="100%"
|-
! style="background:#8c191c; color:#fff;" colspan="8"|Autumn Term
|-
! style="background:#8c191c; color:#fff;"| No.
! style="background:#8c191c; color:#fff;"| Title
! style="background:#8c191c; color:#fff;"| Directed by
! style="background:#8c191c; color:#fff;"| Written by
! style="background:#8c191c; color:#fff;"| Original air date
! style="background:#8c191c; color:#fff;"| UK viewers(million)
|-

|-
! style="background:#8c191c; color:#fff;" colspan="8"|Spring Term

|-

|-

|-

|-

|-

|-

|-

|-

|-

! style="background:#8c191c; color:#fff;" colspan="8"|Summer Term

|}

DVD release
The Autumn Term (episodes 1–10) was released on 4 February 2013. The Spring Term (episodes 11–20) was released on 3 June 2013. The Summer Term (episodes 21–30) was released on 7 October 2013. The Complete Series Eight was released on 15 September 2014.

Footnotes

References

2012 British television seasons
2013 British television seasons
Waterloo Road (TV series)